The Cap is a 1985 Canadian short film directed and written by Robert A. Duncan. The film is based on a short story by Morley Callaghan. The film was produced by Michael MacMillan, Seaton McLean, Janice Platt Andy Thomson. The production agencies were Atlantis Films Limited and the National Film Board of Canada.

Plot
The plot centres on a young boy from Montreal named Steve (Nicholas Podbrey) who is given a baseball cap by his idol, Andre Dawson of the Montreal Expos. One day, Steve loses the cap and soon after discovers that it was found by the boy of a wealthy businessman. Steve along with his unemployed father (Michael Ironside), go to the wealthy boy's house to discuss the matter. After a long and heated debate, Steve and his father leave empty-handed.

Cast

External links
 
 NFB Bio/filmography

1984 films
1984 short films
1980s sports films
Canadian drama short films
National Film Board of Canada short films
Montreal Expos
Canadian baseball films
Films set in Montreal
Films shot in Montreal
Films based on short fiction
Quebec films
1980s English-language films
1980s Canadian films